Tokyo is a 2004 novel by British crime writer Mo Hayder. It was short-listed for the Crime Writers' Association Gold Dagger award, as well as several others. (For the US market, the title was changed to "The Devil of Nanking," which had been Hayder's working-title for the book.) Tokyo was reviewed by the internationally read UK newspaper, the Guardian as well as by Kirkus Reviews under its US title.

Plot introduction
The story is about a young woman (nicknamed 'Grey' by a fellow mental hospital patient) who is obsessed with the 1937 Japanese invasion of Nanking, also known as the Rape of Nanking. She travels to Japan in order to find a professor said to have rare footage of the massacre detailing an event that she could not otherwise prove occurred. The professor decides that he will only show her the tape if she was to procure an unknown ingredient of Chinese medicine from the local Yakuza group. After being recruited into a host club, Grey finds her chance.

Major themes
The book deals with the evils of ignorance, Grey being a home-schooled child whose mother heavily censored everything she came into contact with, the politics of modern-day Yakuza, and the glitzy underground night-life of Tokyo, as well as the build-up and reality of the massacre of Nanking and the effect it still has today.

References

2004 British novels
British thriller novels
Novels set in Tokyo
Japan in non-Japanese culture
Bantam Press books